Ex Tuuttiz, formerly Tuuttimörkö, is a Finnish rapper. He started his career in a group SNTC Family with Crack-Orava, Nunton and SLTF and has since then appeared as a featured guest on albums by DJ Kridlokk and Eevil Stöö & Koksukoo. Tuuttimörkö's first solo album On totta was released on January 18, 2013. In the first week of its release, the album peaked at number three on the Official Finnish Album Chart.

Ex Tuuttiz also uses the pseudonym Aaro Di Costa when performing electronic music in the group Mad Max Mattel.

Discography

Solo albums
On totta (2013)
Kromihammas (2016)
Kaikki keil on välii digaa Ex Tuuttizt (2020)

SNTC Family
Kankkushorror (EP, 2006)
Puolikas (EP, 2007)
Jymyhitit (album, 2011)

As a featured guest
"Kuse viuluus" by DJ Kridlokk (2011)
"Yksikahdeksan seitsemän" by Nunton (2011)
"Streiffaa" by Eevil Stöö & Koksukoo (2012)
"Tähtisadetikkui rakettei tykäreit" by KC/MD Mafia (2012)

References

Living people
Finnish rappers
Year of birth missing (living people)